The 2011–12 winter transfer window for Norwegian football transfers opened on 1 January and closed on 31 March 2012. Additionally, players without a club may join at any time. This list includes transfers featuring at least one Tippeligaen or Adeccoligaen club which are completed after the end of the summer 2011 transfer window and before the end of the 2011–12 winter window.

Transfers

All players and clubs without a flag are Norwegian.

References 

Transfers winter 2011–12
2011–12
Norway
Transfers